Western United Football Club (A-League Women), an association football club based in Truganina, Melbourne, was founded in 2022 after a successful bid to enter the A-League Women for the 2022–23 season. The club's first team has competed in the A-League Women, and all players who have played at least one match are listed below.

Five players currently holds the record for the greatest number of appearances for Western United (A-League Women). Since 2022 they all played 13 times for the club. The club's goalscoring record is currently held by Hannah Keane who has scored 10 goals in the A-League Women.

Key
 The list is ordered first by date of debut, and then if necessary in alphabetical order.
 Appearances as a substitute are included.
 Statistics are correct up to and including the match played on 11 February 2023. Where a player left the club permanently after this date, his statistics are updated to his date of leaving.

Players
Players highlighted in bold are still actively playing at Western United (A-League Women).

References

Western United FC (A-League Women) players
Western United (A-League Women)
Western United FC
Association football player non-biographical articles